Vogel Award may refer to:

The Australian/Vogel Literary Award, for Australian writers under the age of 35
The Sir Julius Vogel Award, for New Zealand science fiction, fantasy, and horror